Club Sportivo Cienciano is a professional football club based in Cusco, Peru that currently plays in the Peruvian Primera División.

The club was founded in 1901 by a group of students of the Colegio Nacional Ciencias del Cusco (National Science School of Cusco). They decided to give the club its name based on the word Ciencias, which means "Science".

It gained worldwide recognition after defeating River Plate in the finals of the 2003 Copa Sudamericana and Boca Juniors in the 2004 Recopa Sudamericana. To this day, Cienciano is the only Peruvian club to win an international competition.

History

Beginnings
Cienciano was founded on 8 July 1901 by a group of students from the National School of Science of Cusco (Colegio Nacional Ciencias del Cusco). It participated in several leagues and tournaments of the region.

In 1966 Hector Ladrón de Guevara was the inaugural Cienciano player to be named captain of the Peru national team. In 1972, it began to play in the Peruvian First Division; however, the club was relegated four years later.

In 1988, the FPF invited the club to play in a tournament of the southern region. In 1991, Cienciano won the tournament and in 1992 it once again played in the First Division.

The Golden age (2000–2007)

First League title 
In 2001, Cienciano won its first title with the 2001 Torneo Clausura, although it lost the superfinal (played between the winners of the Apertura and Clausura tournaments) to Alianza Lima.

Copa Sudamericana win 
In 2003, Cienciano, led by Peruvian coach Freddy Ternero, qualified to the Copa Sudamericana for the first time in its history, after beating Sporting Cristal in an internal qualifying tournament. The team went through every later knockout round as the clear underdog defeating Peru's Alianza Lima, Chile's Universidad Católica, Colombia's Atlético Nacional (once Copa Libertadores champion) and Brazil's Santos (twice Copa Libertadores champion), to get to the finals. Once at the finals the team faced one of the biggest teams in South American football, River Plate of Argentina (twice Copa Libertadores champion). After a 3–3 draw in Buenos Aires, Cienciano went on to win 1–0 in Peru with a free-kick goal by Paraguayan defender Carlos Lugo, which put the aggregate score at 4–3 in its favor to win the final. The game was played at Estadio de la UNSA in Arequipa (home of Cienciano's rivals Melgar, some of whose fans actually attended the match to root for River Plate) because of the insufficient capacity for a CONMEBOL final of the Estadio Garcilaso (which has been expanded since then).

This was the first international championship for a Peruvian team in history; only two other Peruvian teams had advanced to the finals of an international tournament, which was in the Copa Libertadores (Universitario in 1972 and Sporting Cristal in 1997). Both teams were defeated in the finals. The win was considered a severe upset because Cienciano had never been the Peru national champion (the team did win one half-year tournament in 2001 but lost the national championship title through a penalty shootout to the winner of the second tournament, Alianza Lima, in the year in which both celebrated their centenary. The situation was repeated in 2006, but reversed: Cienciano won the second tournament but lost the final to Alianza Lima on aggregate.

Recopa Sudamericana win
After winning the Copa Sudamericana, Cienciano went on to play against Boca Juniors of Argentina, another South American giant, for the 2004 Recopa Sudamericana, this being just one match, much like the UEFA Super Cup, which was disputed between the winners of both South American Cups of the previous season: the Copa Sudamericana and the Copa Libertadores. After a 1–1 draw, Cienciano went on to win the title 4–2 on penalties. The match was played at Lockhart Stadium in Fort Lauderdale, Florida.

More league titles and superfinal runner-ups 
In 2005, the Cusco-based club won the Torneo Apertura, but lost the superfinal to Sporting Cristal. The following year, it won the 2006 Clausura, but lost the superfinal again to Alianza Lima, the same team that had beaten them in the 2001 national championship final.

Relegation and comeback 
In 2015, the club was relegated after finishing in the bottom three of the aggregate table. The club was very close to reaching promotion many times, especially in 2018, where the team lost the final game of its 4 team group. In 2019, it was finally promoted back to the first division after winning the 2019 Liga 2.

Rivalries
Cienciano has had a long-standing rivalry with Melgar, Real Garcilaso and Deportivo Garcilaso.

Stadium

Cienciano plays its home games in Estadio Garcilaso de la Vega which is in Cusco. It was named after the Peruvian Inca Garcilaso de la Vega. When first inaugurated in 1950, it had a spectator capacity of 22,000 and had a running track. In 2004, the stadium's capacity was expanded to 42,000, losing its running track, because of Cienciano's success in international tournaments and it would be a venue in the 2004 Copa América. Cienciano shares the stadium with city rivals Deportivo Garcilaso and Cusco FC.

Current squad
.

Honours

National

League
Peruvian Primera División:
Runner-up (3): 2001, 2005, 2006

Torneo Apertura:
Winners (1): 2005
Runner-up (2): 2004, 2007

Torneo Clausura:
Winners (2): 2001, 2006

 Liga 2:
 Winners (1) : 2019

Copa Perú:
Runner-up (1): 1973

Regional
Liga Departamental del Cusco:
Winners (28): 1903, 1912, 1913, 1914, 1915, 1924, 1927, 1928, 1929, 1931, 1936, 1944, 1945, 1948, 1952, 1954, 1955, 1956, 1959, 1961, 1962, 1964, 1965, 1966, 1967, 1972, 1981, 1983

International
Copa Sudamericana:
Winners (1): 2003

Recopa Sudamericana:
Winners (1): 2004

Friendly National
Copa El Gráfico-Perú:
Winners (2): 2004, 2005

Copa Callao:
Runner-up (1): 2007

Performance in CONMEBOL competitions
Copa Libertadores: 6 appearances
2002: Round of 16
2004: First Round
2005: Preliminary Round
2006: Second Round
2007: Second Round
2008: Second Round

Copa Sudamericana: 3 appearances
2003: Winner
2004: Preliminary Round
2009: Round of 16
2022: First Stage
2023: First Stage

Recopa Sudamericana: 1 appearance
2004: Winner

Notable players

  Sergio Ibarra
  Carlos Lugo
  Santiago Acasiete
  Juan Carlos Bazalar
  Germán Carty
  Paolo de la Haza
  Julio García
  Óscar Ibáñez
  Carlos Lobatón
  Alessandro Morán
  Ramón Rodríguez

Managers

 Eloy Campos (1977)
 Diego Agurto (1986–87)
 Gualberto Martínez Sarabia (1991)
 Ramón Quiroga (1992)
 Hector Berrío Vega (1993)
 Luis Roth (1993)
 Freddy Ternero (1994)
 César Cubilla (1994)
 Victor Bustamante (1995–96)
 Francisco Bertocchi (1995)
 Ramón Quiroga (1996–98)
 Antonio Alzamendi (1998)
 Freddy Ternero (2000–01)
 Carlos Jurado (1999-2000 / 2001)
 Teddy Cardama (2002)
 Freddy Ternero (2003–04)
 Carlos Sevilla (2005)
 Wilmar Valencia (1 Jan 2005 – 26 Mar 2006)
 Julio César Uribe (1 Jan 2007 – 8 Mar 2007)
 José Basualdo (19 March 2007 – 27 Sept 2007)
 Franco Navarro (2007–08)
 Julio César Uribe (20 July 2008 – 15 April 2009)
 Marcelo Trobbiani (18 April 2009 – 2 Oct 2009)
 José Torres (2 Sept 2009 – 31 Dec 2009)
 Edgar Ospina (1 Jan 2010 – 3 May 2010)
Sergio Ibarra (interim) (6 May 2010 – 30 June 2010)
 Marcelo Trobbiani (18 Jan 2011 – 22 Feb 2012)
 Carlos Jurado (30 Aug 2011 – 17 April 2012)
 Raúl Arias (19 April 2012 – 20 Nov 2012)
 Mario Viera (29 Nov 2012 – 13 May 2014)
 Paul Cominges (2015–)

See also
Cienciano in South American football
Once Caldas, another surprise international competition winner in the same year
2003 Cienciano season

References

External links

 
Football clubs in Peru
Association football clubs established in 1901
University and college association football clubs
Copa Sudamericana winning clubs
Recopa Sudamericana winning clubs